Pearic may refer to:
Pearic languages
Pearic peoples